Distortion denotes the alteration of the original shape of an object, image, sound, or waveform.

Distortion may also refer to:

Science and technology 
Distortion (optics), including "barrel distortion" and "pincushion distortion"
 Perspective distortion
Cognitive distortion, thoughts that are exaggerated and irrational
Parataxic distortion, inclination to skew perceptions of others based on fantasy
Distortions (economics), a concept in economics
Distortion function, used to define distortion risk measures
 In mathematics, distortion has several meanings, including:
 Distortion (mathematics), a measure of how much a function distorts angles
 Stretch factor, also called distortion, a measure of how much a function distorts distances between points
 Subgroup distortion, a related idea in geometric group theory

Music 
Distortion (music), an electro-acoustic effect in music
Copenhagen Distortion, also called 'Distortion festival', a party/club culture festival in Copenhagen, Denmark
Social Distortion, an American punk rock band

Albums
Distortion (Forbidden album), 1995
Distortion (Game Theory EP), 1984
Distortion (The Magnetic Fields album), 2008
Distortion (the Proletariat EP), 1982
Distortion (Joseph Simmons album), 2005
Distortions (album), a 1967 album by the Litter

Songs
"Distortion" (Jessica Sutta song), 2016
"Distortion" (Babymetal song), 2018

Other 
"Distortion", an episode of the anime TV series Serial Experiments Lain

See also 
Deformation (disambiguation)
Distort (disambiguation)
Distorted (disambiguation)